Pireh Mashan (also Romanized as Pīreh Māshān; also known as Perah Bāshān, Pereh Bāshān, and Pīrāmāshān) is a village in Seyyedan Rural District, Abish Ahmad District, Kaleybar County, East Azerbaijan Province, Iran. At the 2006 census, its population was 103, in 28 families.

References 

Populated places in Kaleybar County